The Sultans (French: Les Sultans, Italian: L'amante italiana) is a 1966 French-Italian drama film directed by Jean Delannoy.

Plot

Cast
 Gina Lollobrigida : Lisa Bortoli
 Louis Jourdan : Laurent Messager
 Corinne Marchand : Mireille
 Daniel Gélin : Léo
 Philippe Noiret : Michel dit « Michou »
 Muriel Baptiste : Kim Messager
 Renée Faure : Odette Messager
 Rosy Varte : Delphine
 Claude Gensac : Marcelle
 Lucia Modugno : Maguy

References

External links

Les Sultans at Films de France

1966 drama films
1966 films
Films directed by Jean Delannoy
French drama films
1960s French-language films
Italian drama films
Films with screenplays by Jean-Loup Dabadie
1960s French films
1960s Italian films